The Canada national badminton team represents Canada in international badminton team competitions. It is controlled by the nation's governing body of badminton, Badminton Canada. The team's best result was achieving two semifinal finishes in both Thomas Cup and the Uber Cup.

Canada is one of the most prestigious badminton countries in the Americas, winning almost every mixed team event in the Pan American Badminton Championships and also winning gold in both men and women's teams. Next to the United States, Canada has won 21 gold medals, 22 silvers and 12 bronzes in badminton at the Pan American Games.

Participation in BWF competitions

Thomas Cup 

Uber Cup 

Sudirman Cup

Participation in the Commonwealth Games 

Men's team

Women's team

Mixed team

Participation in Pan American Badminton Championships 

The national team has won almost every edition of the Pan American Badminton Championships mixed team events except for one in 2001. The men's team have also became recent champions while the women's team lost to the United States in 2022.

Men's team

Women's team
{| class="wikitable"
|-
! Year !! Result
|-
| 2004 ||  Champions
|-
| 2006 ||  Runner-up
|-
| 2008 ||  Runner-up
|-
| 2010 ||  Semi-finalist
|-
| 2012 ||  Runner-up
|-
| 2016 ||  Runner-up
|-
| 2018 ||  Champions
|-
| 2020 ||  Champions
|-
| 2022 ||  Runner-up
|}Mixed team'''

Current squad 
The following players were selected to represent Canada at the 2022 Thomas & Uber Cup.

Male players
Brian Yang
Jason Anthony Ho-Shue
Nyl Yakura
B. R. Sankeerth
Victor Lai
Kevin Lee
Adam Dong
Ty Alexander Lindeman

Female players
Michelle Li
Wenyu Zhang
Talia Ng
Rachel Chan
Kristen Tsai
Rachel Honderich
Catherine Choi
Josephine Wu
Crystal Lai

References

Badminton
National badminton teams
Badminton in Canada